The 2020 Shore Lunch 150 was the seventh stock car race of the 2020 ARCA Menards Series, the third race of the 2020 Sioux Chief Showdown, and the 14th iteration of the event. The race was held on Saturday, July 18, 2020, in Newton, Iowa at Iowa Speedway, a 7⁄8 mile (1.4 km) permanent D-shaped oval racetrack. The race took the scheduled 150 laps to complete. At race's end, Ty Gibbs of Joe Gibbs Racing would dominate and win his fifth career ARCA Menards Series win and his third of the season. To fill out the podium, Sam Mayer of GMS Racing and Bret Holmes of Bret Holmes Racing would finish second and third, respectively.

Background 

Iowa Speedway is a 7/8-mile (1.4 km) paved oval motor racing track in Newton, Iowa, United States, approximately 30 miles (48 km) east of Des Moines. The track was designed with influence from Rusty Wallace and patterned after Richmond Raceway, a short track where Wallace was very successful. It has over 25,000 permanent seats as well as a unique multi-tiered Recreational Vehicle viewing area along the backstretch.

Entry list

Practice 
The only one-hour practice session would occur on Saturday, July 18.

Starting lineup 
ARCA would not hold a qualifying session for the race. Therefore, the current 2020 owner's standings would be determined for who got the pole. As a result, Chandler Smith of Venturini Motorsports won the pole.

Full starting lineup

Race results

References 

2020 ARCA Menards Series
NASCAR races at Iowa Speedway
July 2020 sports events in the United States
2020 in sports in Iowa